Ambalikoppa is a village in Dharwad district of Karnataka, India.

Demographics 
As of the 2011 Census of India there were 215 households in Ambalikoppa and a total population of 1,081 consisting of 552 males and 529 females. There were 171 children ages 0-6.

References

Villages in Dharwad district